Tiomolibdic acid (trade name Decuprate) is a chelating agent under investigation for the treatment of cancer and of Wilson's disease, a rare and potentially fatal disease in which the body cannot regulate copper. It is developed by Wilson Therapeutics and used in form of the salt bis-choline tetrathiomolybdate.

Wilson's disease is an autosomal recessive genetic disorder that is manifested by serious hepatic, neurologic or psychiatric symptoms. The disease is fatal if left untreated. It is estimated that approximately 1 individual in every 30,000 worldwide has Wilson's disease, corresponding to approximately 15,000 individuals in the European Union and approximately 11,000 in the United States.

Bis-choline tetrathiomolybdate has been evaluated in clinical trials in patients with various forms of cancer and has received orphan designation in the US and EU as a potential therapy against Wilson's disease.

Pharmacology

Mechanism of action
Tiomolibdic acid selectively forms highly stable complexes with copper and proteins. These complexes are then believed to be primarily excreted via the bile, restoring the normal excretion route of copper that is impaired in patients with Wilson's disease.

The binding and excretion mechanism is stable; whereas many de-coppering agents form unstable complexes that are excreted via urine.

Clinical trials

As of November 2014, a Phase 2, multi-centre, open-label study was recruiting newly diagnosed Wilson's disease patients 18 and older to evaluate the efficacy and safety of bis-choline tetrathiomolybdate administration over a 24-week period.

As of 2016, tetrathiomolybdate had been tested in over 500 patients for up to seven years, primarily in oncology and Wilson's disease, as well as some other clinical pathologies.
 
The data suggest that bis-choline tetrathiomolybdate can rapidly lower and control toxic free copper levels and improve clinical symptoms in Wilson's disease patients. The data also suggest that it is generally well tolerated, with the potential for a reduced risk of neurological worsening after initiation of therapy compared to existing therapies.

Dosing
Previous clinical studies with bis-choline tetrathiomolybdate in oncology patients have shown that it can lower and maintain copper levels using a once or twice daily oral dosing. This may be helpful since untreated Wilson's disease may lead to death within several years of the onset of symptoms, and medication use should continue throughout the patient's lifespan. Patient compliance is crucial for clinical improvement, and it is a particular challenge for Wilson's disease patients taking de-coppering treatments.

Society and culture

Names 
Tiomolibdic acid is the recommended International nonproprietary name (INN).

References

External links 
 

Molybdenum(VI) compounds
Orphan drugs
Thiometallates